Rainbow Parade was a series of 26 animated shorts produced by Van Beuren Studios and distributed to theaters by RKO between 1934 and 1936. This was the all-color series and final series produced by Van Beuren.

History
Many of the Rainbow Parade cartoons were one-shot stories with no recurring characters, but several of the films featured Parrotville Parrots, Molly Moo-Cow, Toonerville Folks, and Felix the Cat. This series was purchased by Commonwealth Pictures in 1941 and was later syndicated for television, sometimes under the name Kolor Kartoons. In 2021, Thunderbean Animation, in association with Blackhawk Films and the UCLA, released a collection of the first 13 Rainbow Parade cartoons from the existing master materials, updating the DVD collection from 2009. The second half of the series is available from the best existing prints released by Image DVD/Blackhawk Films/Film Preservation Associates.

Filmography

The first 13 cartoons in the series were all produced in two-strip Cinecolor. Starting with 'Molly Moo and the Butterflies', the remainder of the series was produced in three-strip Technicolor.

References

External links
Other Studios : V : Van Beuren Studios : Rainbow Parade, bcdb.com

Animated film series
Film series introduced in 1934
American animation anthology series
Van Beuren Studios
American animated short films